Paul Buser (born 26 July 1934) is a Swiss former sports shooter. He competed at the 1972 Summer Olympics and the 1976 Summer Olympics.

References

1934 births
Living people
Swiss male sport shooters
Olympic shooters of Switzerland
Shooters at the 1972 Summer Olympics
Shooters at the 1976 Summer Olympics
Place of birth missing (living people)
20th-century Swiss people